Sowmeeh (also Romanized as Şowme‘eh) is a village in Rivand Rural District, in the Central District of Nishapur County, Razavi Khorasan Province, Iran. At the 2006 census, its population was 78, in 23 families.

References 

Populated places in Nishapur County